LG Tractors was a division of LG Cable.  The group of companies were formerly known as GoldStar Cable.

It is part of the LG Group. In 2005, LG Cable split off and became a separate company, taking the name LS Cable.

The tractor division began in 1975 as a part of Hyundai in cooperation with Yanmar of Japan. See GoldStar for more history.

LG had tie-ups with Mitsubishi and Fiat/New Holland, (CNH Global), and sold tractors under the LG, LG-Fiat and LG-New Holland brands.

They also built tractors for sale by LG Montana, TAFE, LongAgri and Farmtrac in North America.

In 2005, LG Cable split off from LG and became LS Cable.  The tractor division became LS Tractors, and tractors began to be sold under the LS and LS-New Holland brands.

LG Corporation
South Korean brands